Trimido Vaqueriza (born 6 August 1929) is a Spanish rower. He competed in the men's eight event at the 1960 Summer Olympics.

References

1929 births
Living people
Spanish male rowers
Olympic rowers of Spain
Rowers at the 1960 Summer Olympics
Sportspeople from San Sebastián
Rowers from the Basque Country (autonomous community)